Rhytiphora piperitia is a species of beetle in the family Cerambycidae. It was described by Frederick William Hope in 1841. It is known from Australia.

References

piperitia
Beetles described in 1841